Avraham Offer (1922 as Avraham Hirsch – 3 January 1977) was an Israeli politician, famous for committing suicide following the eruption of a corruption scandal.

Biography 
Offer was born in the Chorostków shtetl in Poland (today in Ukraine) in 1922, and immigrated to Mandatory Palestine in 1933. He went to High School in Jerusalem and studied in the Hebrew University of Jerusalem. In 1937 he joined the Haganah and in 1942 he was among the founders of Kibbutz Hamadia. In 1944 he was one of the founders of the Young Leadership in Mapai and among of founders and first Director of HaKfar HaYarok.

In the 1948 Arab-Israeli War, he was one of the 3 men who were charged with building the Israeli Navy and served in it as a lieutenant colonel, and was later the first commander of the Eilat Naval Base.

In 1952, he was elected Secretary of Mapai in Tel Aviv District. In 1958, he joined the Agriculture Ministry, established the Poultry Council and became Deputy Director General for Economic Affairs. In 1964, he was a member of the delegation that conducted negotiations with the European Community and at the end of that year he was appointed General Manager of "Ashdod Company". In 1965, he was elected to the Tel Aviv City Council and was Deputy Mayor of Tel Aviv until 1967, when he was appointed Managing Director of "Shikun Ovdim". In 1969, he was elected to the 7th Knesset for the Alignment. He is known for his amendment to the election law, initiated along with Gahal's Yohanan Bader, which adapted the D'Hondt method, effective since the 8th Knesset. In 1973, he was appointed Minister of Housing by Yitzhak Rabin.

The scandal 
In November 1976, Yigal Laviv, a correspondent of the weekly Haolam Hazeh who had also been involved in airing the charges against Asher Yadlin, gave the police information on 30 different matters raising suspicions of offenses committed by Offer, including allegations of embezzlement in Shikun Ovdim funds in favor of the party. The police examined Laviv's charges, but came to the conclusion toward the end of the year that they were not substantiated, leading Offer to expect that an official statement clearing him would soon be made. However, Attorney General Aharon Barak decided to continue with the investigation based on a new testimony.

On 31 December, however, a witness in the Yadlin affair sent the police a statement which raised more questions for investigation, and various rumors were published about possible charges. On 2 January, Prime Minister Rabin and Justice Minister Zadok assured Offer that everything possible would be done to expedite the inquiry.

On January 3, his body was found in his car on a Tel Aviv beach. In a suicide note, Offer said he was innocent, but did not have the strength "to bear any more." He was reported to have been particularly depressed by the lack of support from his political associates.

Rabin delivered the eulogy at Offer's funeral. Speaking to the country's political elite at a crowded service in Tel Aviv, Rabin recalled how Offer had come to him to discuss the accusations in what turned out to be their final meeting. "Your words still ring in my ears," the Premier said. ' 'Yitzhak,' you told me, 'believe me, I am not guilty of any transgressions.' I replied to you, Avraham, that I, Yitzhak Rabin, wholly trust in your innocence."

The succession of scandals led Rabin's opponents to charge that he lacked the ability to lead, and in the 1977 elections the Alignment indeed lost. After his death, the charges were dropped and Offer's guilt was never proven. Today, his suicide is often seen as a display of civil servant shame that is missing in contemporary Israeli politicians.

References

External links 
 
 Avraham Offer on the site put together by an investigative team and his son, Dan Offer

1922 births
1977 suicides

Israeli politicians who committed suicide
Suicides by firearm in Israel
Alignment (Israel) politicians
Members of the 7th Knesset (1969–1974)
Members of the 8th Knesset (1974–1977)
Ministers of Housing of Israel
Deputy Mayors of Tel Aviv-Yafo
Polish emigrants to Mandatory Palestine
1977 deaths